Beverly Hills Nannies is an American reality television series that aired on ABC Family in the U.S. and ABC Spark in Canada. It debuted on July 11, 2012.

Nannies
 Kristin Lancione (from Fremont, California)
 Justin Allen Sylvester (from Breaux Bridge, Louisiana)
 Lucy Anne Treadway (from Cincinnati, Ohio)
 Amanda Averill (from West Bend, Wisconsin)
 Scott Cartmill (from Maryborough, Queensland)
 Amber Valdez (from Seattle, Washington)
 Shayla Quinn (from Orange County, California)
 Shaun Sturz (from Bakersfield, California)
 Maggie Thorne (from Fremont, California)

Children/families 
 The Margolis Family
Nicholas (born in 2002) and twin girls Sabrina and Sierra (born in 2005) are the children of American glamour spokesmodel and actress Cindy Margolis.
 The Tsircou Family
Xander Tsircou (born in 2011) is the son of Kyri and Marika Tsircou. Marika is an artist (abstract oil painter) and stay at home mommy, while Kyri is an IP Patent attorney who has his own firm, Tsircou Law.
 The Thames Family
Wylder Thames (born 2009) is the son of Tricia Leigh Fisher - daughter of Eddie Fisher and Connie Stevens, sister of Joely Fisher and half-sister of Carrie Fisher - and former actor and music producer husband Byron Thames.
 The Bellamar Family
Emma Bellamar (born in 2008) is the daughter of Ariane Bellamar.
 The Faulk Family 

Gabrielle (Bella) (born in 1999), Presley (born in 1999), Farrah (born in 2002) and Brooklyn (born in 2007) Faulk are the children of Lindsay Faulk, ex-wife of former NFL running back and Hall of Famer Marshall Faulk.
 The Solomon Family

Sterling (born in 2010) is son of same-sex partners Sherry Solomon and Dana Solomon, owners of high-end LA design company 22 Bond St..
 The Elkins Family
Dane (born in 1999), Cody (born in 2004), Jaden (born in 2001), and Madison (born in 2007) Elkins are the children of Deborah and Brett Elkins.

Plot
The show focuses on a group of young nannies working for upper-class families in some of the world's wealthiest zip codes.

Episodes

References

External links 
 

2010s American reality television series
2012 American television series debuts
2012 American television series endings
ABC Family original programming
English-language television shows
Television shows set in Beverly Hills, California
Television series by Disney–ABC Domestic Television
Women in California